Mereküla is a village in Häädemeeste Parish, Pärnu County in Estonia.

References

Villages in Pärnu County